Bedirkent (formerly, Ataev) is a village in Görogly District, Turkmenistan.

History 
Bedirkent served as the headquarters of Junaid Khan, a Khivan ruler who tried to resist the Bolsheviks; he was unsuccessful and Bedirkent fell on the evening of 23 January, 1920. It was renamed to Ataev in 1961 before being returned to its original name in 1999.

Site 
The ruins of a fortress, especially its mud-brick walls, are all that is prominent.

Tourism 
Considered to be a border village, foreigners need special permission for access.

Notable People 

 Beki Seitakov

References 

Populated places in Turkmenistan